Wilt is a surname. Notable people with the surname include:

 Clara Antoinette McCarty Wilt (1858–1929), the first woman superintendent of the Pierce County School District
 Marie Wilt (1833–1891), an Austrian dramatic coloratura soprano
 Peter Wilt, a soccer executive
 Raymond Wilt, a former Republican member of the Pennsylvania House of Representatives
 Rod Wilt, a former Republican member of the Pennsylvania House of Representatives
 Roy Wilt, a former Republican member of the Pennsylvania House of Representatives
 Toby S. Wilt (born c. 1945), American businessman and golfer
 W. William Wilt, a former Republican member of the Pennsylvania House of Representatives